Literally "song" in Italian, a canzone (plural: canzoni; cognate with English to chant) is an Italian or Provençal song or ballad. It is also used to describe a type of lyric which resembles a madrigal.  Sometimes a composition which is simple and songlike is designated as a canzone, especially if it is by a non-Italian; a good example is the aria "Voi che sapete" from Mozart's Marriage of Figaro.

The term canzone is also used interchangeably with canzona, an important Italian instrumental form of the late 16th and early 17th century.  Often works designated as such are canzoni da sonar; these pieces are an important precursor to the sonata.  Terminology was lax in the late Renaissance and early Baroque music periods, and what one composer might call "canzoni da sonar" might be termed "canzona" by another, or even "fantasia".  In the work of some composers, such as Paolo Quagliati, the terms seem to have had no formal implication at all.

Derived from the Provençal canso, the very lyrical and original Italian canzone consists of 5 to 7 stanzas typically set to music, each stanza resounding the first in rhyme scheme and in number of lines (7 to 20 lines).  The canzone is typically hendecasyllabic (11 syllables).  The congedo or commiato also forms the pattern of the Provençal tornado, known as the French envoi, addressing the poem itself or directing it to the mission of a character, originally a personage.  Originally delivered at the Sicilian court of Emperor Frederick II during the 13th century of the Middle Ages, the lyrical form was later commanded by Dante, Petrarch, Boccaccio, and leading Renaissance writers such as Spenser (the marriage hymn in his Epithalamion).

Minnesang
The canzone (German "Kanzone") is the characteristic strophic form of Minnesang, the Middle High German lyric genre. In Minnesang, the canzone follows the tri-partite structure of the Provençal canso: two metrically identical Stollen ("supports") form the Aufgesang (literally "up-song"), which is followed by a metrically distinct Abgesang ("down-song"). The following rules generally apply:
 each line in the first Stollen rhymes with the matching line in the second
 the Abgesang introduces new rhymes and may contain a non-rhyming line
 the Abgesang is longer than a single Stollen but shorter than the entire Aufgesang.

This basic pattern is typical of early Minnesang. As the genre develops, more complex forms are found. For example, one of Neithart's Winter Songs, "Winder, dîniu meil" (No. 32), has a 14-line canzone with the rhyme scheme a b c d | a b c d || e e f g f g.

The earliest canzone in Minnesang date from the late 12th Century and are part of the more general influence of the Romance lyric.

See also
Chanson, a genre named after the equivalent French word

Notes

References and further reading
 
 "Canzone", in The New Grove Dictionary of Music and Musicians, ed. Stanley Sadie.  20 vol.  London, Macmillan Publishers Ltd., 1980.  
 The New Harvard Dictionary of Music, ed. Don Randel.  Cambridge, Massachusetts, Harvard University Press, 1986.  
 "Canzone", in The Shapes of our Singing, a comprehensive guide to verse forms and metres from around the world, by Robin Skelton.  EWU, Spokane, WA, 2002.  

Medieval music genres
Renaissance music
Baroque music
Song forms